Liocrobyla minima is a moth of the family Gracillariidae. It is known from Tajikistan and Turkmenistan

References

Gracillariinae
Moths described in 1992